Events from the year 1991 in Taiwan, Republic of China. This year is numbered Minguo 80 according to the official Republic of China calendar.

Incumbents
 President – Lee Teng-hui
 Vice President – Li Yuan-tsu
 Premier – Hau Pei-tsun
 Vice Premier – Shih Chi-yang

Events

January
 28 January – The establishment of Mainland Affairs Council.

March
 9 March – The official establishment of Straits Exchange Foundation in Taipei.

April
 22 April – The abolishment of the Temporary Provisions Effective During the Period of Communist Rebellion.

May
 11 May – The opening of Wang-an Airport in Wangan Township, Penghu.

June
 1 June – The establishment of Mandarin Airlines.

July
 1 July
 The maiden flight of EVA Air.
 The establishment of National Pingtung Institute of Commerce in Pingtung City, Pingtung County.
 The start of Beitou Refuse Incineration Plant commercial operation in Beitou District, Taipei.

December
 22 December – 1991 Republic of China National Assembly election.

Births
 3 February – Jass Yang, musician and producer
 4 February – Ian Chen, singer, songwriter and actor
 5 February – Wang Yao-lin, baseball player
 16 March – Lin Yi-han, former writer
 9 May – Hsu Shu-ching, weightlifter
 29 May – Darren Wang, actor and model
 18 June – Kai Ko, actor and singer
 28 June
 Lin Chang-lun, football athlete
 Tu Kai-wen, judoka
 20 July – Summer Meng, actress
 25 July – Mini Chang, singer and actress
 30 July – Hsu Ya-ching, badminton player
 22 August – Sharon Kao
 27 September
 Ann, singer
 Lin Yu-hsien, badminton player

References

 
Years of the 20th century in Taiwan